Martin Thörnberg (born August 6, 1983) is a Swedish former professional ice hockey player, formerly with HV71 of the Swedish Hockey League (SHL). He is the son of the retired ice hockey player Ove Thörnberg. He also played briefly in the Kontinental Hockey League with Lokomotiv and HC Lev Praha, joining Lokomotiv after Lev Praha announced they would not continue in the KHL due to financial bankruptcy, on July 2, 2014.

Thörnberg announced his retirement after the 2021–22 season, ending his career as HV71's third all-time leading scorer. It was later announced that Thörnberg's jersey number 10 would be retired by the franchise on 5 January 2023.

Awards and honors

References

External links

1983 births
HV71 players
HC Lev Praha players
Lokomotiv Yaroslavl players
Living people
IK Oskarshamn players
Sportspeople from Jönköping
Swedish ice hockey forwards
Torpedo Nizhny Novgorod players
Swedish expatriate sportspeople in the Czech Republic
Swedish expatriate sportspeople in Russia
Swedish expatriate ice hockey people
Expatriate ice hockey players in the Czech Republic
Expatriate ice hockey players in Russia